Gilbam (also Romanized as Gīlbām; also known as Galeh Bām) is a village in Khara Rud Rural District, in the Central District of Siahkal County, Gilan Province, Iran. At the 2006 census, its population was 129, in 34 families.

References 

Populated places in Siahkal County